Charles Bangham  holds the Chair in Immunology at Imperial College London.

Education
Bangham was educated at the University of Cambridge (BA) and the University of Oxford where he was awarded a Bachelor of Medicine, Bachelor of Surgery (BM, BCh). He completed his PhD on immune responses to respiratory syncytial virus (RSV) while working at the National Institute for Medical Research in 1987.

Research and career
Since 1987 Bangham has conducted research on the Human T-lymphotropic virus 1 (HTLV-1). His contributions include the discovery of the viral synapse, the mechanism by which viruses including HTLV-1, HIV and murine leukaemia virus (MLV) are transmitted from cell-to-cell, starting a new field in virology.

Awards and honours
Bangham was elected a Fellow of the Royal Society (FRS) in 2019. He is also a Fellow of the Academy of Medical Sciences (FMedSci) and a Fellow of the Royal College of Pathologists (FRCPath).

References

Living people
Academics of Imperial College London
Alumni of the University of Cambridge
Alumni of the University of Oxford
Fellows of the Academy of Medical Sciences (United Kingdom)
Fellows of the Royal Society
Year of birth missing (living people)